Stictophaula is a genus of Asian Tettigoniidae (bush crickets or katydids) of the tribe Holochlorini within the subfamily Phaneropterinae. They are found in Indo-China, China, and Malesia.

The genus was originally erected in 1922 by Morgan Hebard in the Proceedings of the Academy of Natural Sciences of Philadelphia. The genus Stictophaula is most closely related to Phaula (now Phaulula), also in the tribe Holochlorini, differentiated by wing morphology including the shape of the veins, the male tergites, and female ovipositors.

Species
The Orthoptera Species File lists:
 Stictophaula annae Gorochov, 1998 – Borneo
 Stictophaula armata Ingrisch, 1994 – Thailand
 Stictophaula aspersa Gorochov & Voltshenkova, 2009 – Borneo
 Stictophaula bakeri Hebard, 1922 – type species - Singapore
 Stictophaula brevis (Liu, Zheng & Xi, 1991) - synonym Poecilopsyra brevis - China
 Stictophaula bruneii Tan & Wahab, 2017
 Stictophaula coco Gorochov & Voltshenkova, 2009 – Borneo
 Stictophaula daclacensis Gorochov, 1998 - Đắk Lắk Province, Vietnam
 Stictophaula dohrni Gorochov, 1998
 Stictophaula elzbietae Gorochov, 1998
 Stictophaula exigua Ingrisch, 1994
 Stictophaula gialaiensis Gorochov, 1998
 Stictophaula grigorenkoi Gorochov, 1998
 Stictophaula mada Gorochov, 2011
 Stictophaula micra Hebard, 1922
 Stictophaula mikhaili Gorochov, 2004 – Indonesia
 Stictophaula mistshenkoi Gorochov & Voltshenkova, 2009
 Stictophaula multa Gorochov & Voltshenkova, 2009
 Stictophaula omissa Gorochov, 2003
 Stictophaula quadridens Hebard, 1922
 Stictophaula rara Gorochov & Voltshenkova, 2009
 Stictophaula recens Gorochov & Voltshenkova, 2009
 Stictophaula sinica Gorochov & Kang, 2004
 Stictophaula soekarandae Gorochov, 1998
 Stictophaula spinosolaminata (Brunner von Wattenwyl, 1878)
 Stictophaula thaiensis Gorochov, 1998

Note: S. ocellata Ingrisch, 1994 has now been placed in the genus Arnobia

References

Phaneropterinae
Tettigoniidae genera
Insects of Asia